(Vocal sacred music, literally: Sacred chants), Op. 4, is a collection of forty different pieces of vocal sacred music on Latin texts, composed by Heinrich Schütz and first published in 1625. The general title  was common at the time and was used by many composers, including Palestrina, Byrd and Tallis (1589 and 1591) and Hans Leo Hassler (1591).

Schütz composed the motets and madrigals, based on texts from a 1553 prayerbook  by Andreas Musculus, for four voices (SATB) and basso continuo. Some of the settings form groups of up to five pieces, including the expressive Passion motets, SWV 56 to 60. , SWV 81, is a joyful setting of Psalm 149. The Protestant composer dedicated his work to the Catholic politician Hans Ulrich von Eggenberg. He published it as his . The counterpoint of the Cantiones has been regarded as unmatched in the sacred vocal works of the 17th century.

History 

Schütz composed the pieces during the first years of the Thirty Years' War, when he was in the service of the Protestant Elector of Saxony Johann Georg I, who tried to stay neutral. The texts are mostly taken from a prayerbook by Andreas Musculus, first published in 1553 and often reprinted. Subtitled "" (Church hymns and chants from the collection of David's psalms), it is based on psalms, the Song of Songs, the Gospels, and passages by Bernard of Clairvaux, "significantly designed for intimate and private devotion". Some texts, then believed to be by Augustine such as meditations on the Passion, are now known to be by later writers such as Bernard and Anselm of Canterbury. Schütz set the texts for four voices (SATB) and basso continuo. He conceived the pieces for voices a cappella, but the publisher requested a basso part. The , following the lowest voice, may have been added by a pupil.

Schütz published the collection as his  (Fourth work) in Freiberg in 1625: forty pieces at age forty.

Schütz dedicated the work to the Catholic Prince Hans Ulrich von Eggenberg, an influential politician, whom he first met in 1617, when Eggenberg accompanied Emperor Ferdinand of Habsburg on a visit to Saxony. Musicologist Matteo Messori notes:

Collection 

The collection contains forty different individual motets and madrigals with numbers 53 to 93 in the SWV. Some works form groups of a similar topic of up to five pieces, marked  (part). One movement, the Lord's Prayer, is repeated, being part of two groups. Musicologist Volckmar-Wasch identifies the 13th piece, as especially sad (tristis) and the 29th,  (Sing to the Lord), as happy (laetus).

The following table shows a sequence number, a number of groups, the SWV number, for groups the Latin term of the single part from the print, the first line of the Latin text replacing a title, a translation, an abbreviation of the text source within the prayer book and notes. The translations follow Emmanuel Music for SWV 53 to 81, otherwise the recording of the Heinrich Schütz Edition by Matteo Messori. For biblical quotation, the King James version is additionally supplied in the details about single pieces.

Composition 

The major influence for the compositions was the polyphony of madrigals by Palestrina. Matteo Messori, who has been conducting recordings of the complete works by Schütz, regards the counterpoint of Cantiones as "superlative and unmatched in the sacred vocal works of that century", comparable only to the madrigals alla maniera italiana (in the Italian manner) from Fontana d'Israel, Israelis Brünnlein, published in 1623 by the composer's friend and Thomaskantor Johann Hermann Schein. Musicologist Stephen Rose terms the Cantiones "the composer's "most impassioned pieces" and notes: "They set first-person devotional texts to avant-garde madrigalism", evoking the crucifixion by extreme harmonies and "joy in Christ by dance rhythms".

SWV 53–54 

SWV 56–60 

SWV 56–60 form a group of five Passion motets, set the text of Psalm 115 augmented by Augustine and later authors. Craig Smith notes: "In richness of harmony, intensity of expression, and most importantly, the exploration of the vague, the ambiguous, and the contradictory, they are without equal," and compares them to the drama, light and shade in paintings by Caravaggio.

SWV 63–64 

The biblical text was slightly changed, replacing "soror mea sponsa" (my sister, my spouse) by "filia charissima" (most beloved daughter), which may reflect the composer's loss of his daughter.

SWV 73–75 

SWV 78–80 

Schütz composed the three verses of Psalm 131,  (Lord, my heart is not haughty) in a group of three movements.

SWV 81 

 (Sing to the Lord a new song, is a madrigal setting of the three verses bidding everybody who hears them to sing and play for the Lord. Musicologist Volckmar-Wasch describes the mood as happy (laetus).

SWV 85 

The penitential Psalm 6,  (O Lord, rebuke me not in thine anger) is set in one movement.

Reception 

After the composer's death, the collection was not as popular as his  (Sacred choral music) for which he became known in the 20th century. Musicologists began earlier than the public to be interested in the works and their advanced composition. Carl von Winterfeldt analysed them in his monography of Giovanni Gabrieli, illustrated by musical examples. A thesis by Anna Amalie Abert was published in 1935, another by Heide Volckmar-Waschk in 2001, dedicated to the work's history, texts and analysis.

Publication and recordings 

After the first publication, the Cantiones appeared as part of a complete edition of the composer's works by Breitkopf & Härtel, begun by Philipp Spitta, who published a first volume in 1885, and completed by Arnold Schering and Heinrich Spitta in 1927. This edition was faithful to keys and clefs, a problem for modern performers. In 1960, Gottfried Grote published the collection in the Neue Ausgabe, transposing and with modern meter signs. A critical edition was published in 2004 by Bärenreiter, edited by Heide Volckmar-Waschk, who uses modern clefs, but shows the original clefs and retains the keys and note values.

The Cantiones sacrae are part of the complete edition of the composer's works by Carus-Verlag, begun in 1992 in continuation of the Stuttgart Schütz Edition and planned to be completed by 2017. They were recorded, as part of the complete recordings of works by Schütz, by the Dresdner Kammerchor and organist Ludger Rémy, conducted by Hans-Christoph Rademann.

References

External links 
 

Compositions by Heinrich Schütz
Choral compositions
Psalm settings
1625 works